Emanuele Di Marino (born 9 February 1989) is an Italian Paralympic athlete who specialises in the 400 metres and 4 x 100 metre relay. He is a double World medalist and a European champion.

References

1989 births
Living people
People from Salerno
Paralympic athletes of Italy
Italian male sprinters
Medalists at the World Para Athletics Championships
Medalists at the World Para Athletics European Championships
Athletes (track and field) at the 2016 Summer Paralympics
Sportspeople from the Province of Salerno
21st-century Italian people